The 1963 Deptford by-election was held on 4 July 1963 following the death of the incumbent Labour MP Sir Leslie Plummer on 15 April. The seat was comfortably retained by the future Cabinet Member John Silkin.

References

Deptford,1963
Deptford,1963
Deptford by-election
Deptford by-election
Deptford